The Ridge road is a large open space, located in the center of Shimla, the capital city of Himachal Pradesh, India.  The Ridge is the hub of all cultural activities of Shimla. It is situated along the Mall Road, which is the famous shopping center of Shimla. Most major places of Shimla like Sanjauli Snowdown (IGMC), Mall Road, Jakhu Temple, Oakover, Kali Bari, Annadale, etc. are connected through the Ridge.

It runs east to west alongside the Mall Road, and joins it at the Scandal Point on the west side. On the east side, The Ridge road leads to Lakkar Bazaar, a wooden crafts market. It's the major landmark and the most easily recognized face of the hill station. When winter sets in and when the country had its first major snowfall of the year, most newspapers printed photos of the ridge submerged in clumps of fresh snow.

Prominent landmarks on the Ridge area is Christ Church, a neo-Gothic structure built in 1844 and a Tudorbethan styled library building built in 1910. There are four statues on the ridge; that of Mahatma Gandhi, Indira Gandhi, Dr. Y.S. Parmar the first chief minister of Himachal Pradesh and the recently established statue of Atal Bihari Vajpayee.

The biggest hill city of the world, at one time the base ridge of Shimla had the thickest forest of the area, now the green slopes are covered with firs, pines, the Himalayan oak and carmine rhododendron trees, among which are dotted red-roofed chalets, half-timbered houses and Gothic Government buildings are visible from The Ridge.

Importance

Underneath the Ridge, large water tanks are placed from which water is supplied to the British era tourist town. The Ridge houses the city's lifeline in terms of the water reservoir, with a capacity of 1,000,000 gallons of water, beneath it. Because these tanks are significantly large in size, they have been used as the main water supply for Shimla. The reservoir is stated to have been constructed in the 1880s, without using any cement and only lime mortar was used.

The Ridge is famous for the various government functions and fairs that are held here. It is usually the venue for all such celebrations and events. The most famous festival that is held at the Ridge is the Summer Festival. This famous festival is held during the months of April or May and the whole of Shimla comes alive with colors and a riot of activities. Prominent landmarks on The Ridge include Christ Church, a neo-Gothic structure built in the 1850s, and a Tudorbethan-styled library building.

References

External links
Shimla Tourism at District Administration of Shimla Website

Tourist attractions in Shimla
British-era buildings in Himachal Pradesh